The Backbone of America is a 1953 American TV movie written by Robert E. Sherwood and directed by Marc Daniels.

Plot
An account executive tries to find the perfect American family to use in a forthcoming advertising campaign.

Cast
Wendell Corey as Ben Bruce
Yvonne De Carlo as Victoria Johnson
Gene Lockhart as Uncle Cedric
Thomas Mitchell as Fred Tupple
Sammy Ogg as Wallie
Lee Patrick as Ethel
Gloria Talbott as Janet
Regis Toomey as Bill Carmody

Production
It was the first play Sherwood wrote for television. He did it under a contract with NBC to write nine original plays over three years.

The production was recorded in Hollywood. The cast had two weeks of rehearsals. De Carlo said she was "panicked" to do the show but it ended up well. Alec Guinness had a contract with Alex Korda to make one film a year and he agreed to star.

Reception
The New York Times said the play was "completely disappointing".

References

External links

The Backbone of America at BFI

1953 television films
1953 films
American television films
Plays by Robert E. Sherwood
Films directed by Marc Daniels